Turpan railway station is the main railway station of the conventional lines in Turpan, the second largest city in Xinjiang, China.

General
Turpan railway station opened in 1961 when the Lanzhou–Xinjiang railway was extended via Turpan to Urumqi. In 1984, the Southern Xinjiang railway was laid from Turpan to Korla railway station in Korla.

See also   
Transportation of Turpan
Turpan North railway station

References

External link

Railway stations in Xinjiang
Buildings and structures in Turpan